Sharon Corder is an American writer, producer, and educator based in Toronto, Ontario, Canada. With her husband Jack Blum, she has written and produced more than fifty hours of television drama for both Canadian and American broadcasters. In 2005, Blum and Corder began Reel Canada, their non-profit organization dedicated to celebrating Canadian film.

Biography

Early life and education 
Born in Waco, Texas into a military family, Corder moved across the American Southwest according to her father's deployments, including Hawaii and Japan. She trained in theatre at the University of California at Davis.

Career 
In the mid-1970s, Corder moved to Vancouver to pursue a theatrical career. There, she founded the Genesis Company Theatre, playing leading roles as an actor in travelling productions across Canada. In 1985, she met and began working with Jack Blum, who would become her co-writer and co-producer on Canadian television series like Traders, Catwalk, and Power Play.

In 1998, Corder and Blum wrote and produced Babyface, which premiered at the Director’s Fortnight in Cannes.

Charity work 
In 2005, Corder and Blum founded Reel Canada, an educational program entitled "Our Films in Our Schools" aimed at promoting Canadian film in high schools. The initiative has since spawned "Welcome to Canada," a Canadian film summit for newcomers to Canada, and "National Canadian Film Day," a one-day country-wide celebration of Canadian film with local screening partners in every province and territory. Corder is the Artistic Director of Reel Canada.

Filmography

Movies

Television

Awards 
Getting Out: Dora Mavor Moore Award for Artistic Excellence and Theatrical Innovation

References

Living people
Writers from Texas
Canadian women screenwriters
People from Waco, Texas
Year of birth missing (living people)
American expatriates in Canada
University of California, Davis alumni
Canadian television writers
Canadian women television writers
20th-century Canadian screenwriters
20th-century Canadian women writers
21st-century Canadian screenwriters
21st-century Canadian women writers